The Terry Badlands WSA (also Terry Badlands) is a designated Wilderness Study Area by the Bureau of Land Management. It is located three miles north of the township of Terry, Montana.

It is part of the National Landscape Conservation System.

See also
List of U.S. Wilderness Areas
Wilderness Act

References

External links
Official Bureau of Land Management Website
Custer Country Terry Badlands WSA Website
Montana magazine article

Geography of Prairie County, Montana